The IAMG Distinguished Lectureship is a special lecture series established in the year 2002 by the International Association for Mathematical Geosciences (IAMG). Each year IAMG selects IAMG Distinguished Lecturer, who is an outstanding individual with (i) demonstrated ability to communicate mathematical concepts to general geological audience, (ii) a clear enthusiasm for mathematical geology, (iii) recognition fork in their field, and (iv) established skill in working with individuals and in group discussions on geological problems. The selected IAMG Distinguished Lecturer must be ready to travel and to (i) Prepare and present a lecture suitable for a general geological audience, (ii) Prepare and present one or two lectures on a more specialized topic, and Interact and hold discussions with individuals, both professionals and students, on applications of mathematical geology to local problems of interest.

Lecturers]
2002 John C. Davis
2004 Frederick P. Agterberg
2005 Larry Drew
2006 Larry W. Lake
2007 Vera Pawlowsky-Glahn
2008 Donald Myers
2009–2010 Roussos Dimitrakopoulos
2011–2012 Amilcar Soares
2012 Jack Schuenemeyer
2013 Pierre Goovaerts
2014 Eric Grunsky
2015 Gordon M. Kaufman
2016 Sean McKenna
2017 Clayton V. Deutsch
2018 Gregoire Mariethoz
2019 Philippe Renard
2020 Peter Atkinson
2021 J. Jaime Gómez-Hernández
2022 Qiuming Cheng
2023 Jennifer McKinley

See also

 List of geology awards
 List of mathematics awards

References 

Awards of the International Association for Mathematical Geosciences
Awards established in 2002